The 2007 Women's Bandy World Championship the third Women's Bandy World Championship and was contested between 7 bandy playing countries. The championship was played in Budapest, Hungary from 11–17 February 2007. In the final-game Sweden defeated Russia, 3-2.

Participating nations

Venue

Premier tour
 11 February
 Canada - Hungary 6-0
 12 February
 Russia – Norway 7-1
 Finland – USA 5-0
 Norway – Canada 4-1
 USA - Hungary 10-0
 Sweden - Russia 3-3 (Russia won penalty shoot out)
 13 February
 Finland - Canada 2-3
 Sweden - Hungary 6-0
 Russia - USA 10-0
 Sweden - Norway 10-0
 Russia - Hungary 8-0
 14 February
 Sweden - USA 0-0 (Sweden won penalty shoot out)
 Norway - Finland 2-0
 Russia - Canada 3-0
 Norway - USA 3-0
 Finland - Hungary 4-0
 15 February
 Sweden - Canada 9-0
 Russia - Finland 2-0
 Norway - Hungary 5-0
 Sweden - Finland 7-1
 USA - Canada 1-6

Final Tour

Semifinals 
 16 February
 (S1) Russia - Canada 5-0
 (S2) Sweden - Norway 7-0

Match for 5th place
 16 February
 Finland - USA 2-1

Match for 3rd place
 16 February
 Canada - Norway 3-3 (Norway won penalty shoot out)

Final
 17 February
 Russia - Sweden 2-3

References

2007
 
2007 in Hungarian women's sport
International bandy competitions hosted by Hungary
February 2007 sports events in Europe